Benjamin Dudley may refer to:
 Benjamin Dudley (Archdeacon of Rangiora) (1805–1892), New Zealand Anglican priest
 Benjamin Dudley (Archdeacon of Auckland) (1838–1901), New Zealand Anglican priest
 Benjamin F. Dudley (born 1969), American politician
 Benjamin Winslow Dudley (1785–1870), American surgeon and academic

See also
 Benjamin D. Pritchard (1835–1907), middle name Dudley, American army officer
 Benjamin Dudley Tarlton (1849–1919), American lawyer and judge
 Dudley (surname)